is a Japanese manga series written and illustrated by Tatsuya Endo. The series is loosely based on the Japanese folktale The Tale of the Bamboo Cutter. It was serialized in Shueisha's Jump Square magazine from May 2010 to January 2012 and published in five volumes.

Publication
Written and illustrated by Tatsuya Endo, the series originated as a one-shot published in Weekly Shōnen Jump in 2000, before beginning serialization in Shueisha's Jump Square magazine on May 1, 2010. The series completed its serialization on January 4, 2012. The series individual chapters have been collected into five tankōbon volumes.

In February 2023, Viz Media announced that they licensed the series for English publication.

Volume list

Reception
Erkael of Manga News praised the setting, characters, and artwork, while criticizing the narration. Nicolas Demay of Planete BD also praised the artwork and characters; Demay also praised the story.

References

External links
  
 

Adventure anime and manga
Coming-of-age anime and manga
Kaguya-hime
Science fiction anime and manga
Shōnen manga
Shueisha manga
Viz Media manga